Martha Lou Gadsden (March 20, 1930 – April 1, 2021) was an American chef and restaurateur known for her soul food restaurant Martha Lou's Kitchen in Charleston, South Carolina.

Early life 
Gadsden was born in Charleston to Joseph and Lillie Mae Simmons. When she was five years old, her father died. Her mother sent Martha Lou and her two siblings to live with their grandparents in Manning, South Carolina, while she remained in Charleston to work. Martha Lou was introduced to cooking by her grandmother.

Career 

Gadsden opened Martha Lou's Kitchen in 1983. The restaurant operated until September 1, 2020.

References

External links 

 Interview with Martha Lou Gadsden - Southern Foodways Alliance

1930 births
2021 deaths
American women chefs
American women restaurateurs
American restaurateurs
People from Manning, South Carolina
People from Charleston, South Carolina